James Bond may also refer to:

In Ian Fleming fiction
 James Bond (literary character), information about the literary character
 Portrayal of James Bond in film, information about the film character
 Inspirations for James Bond, the people who Ian Fleming used as an inspiration for James Bond
 Production of the James Bond films, for production background of the film series 
 List of James Bond films, for plot synopses, awards, and box office information for each film in the series
 Motifs in the James Bond film series, the motifs that appear in the series of Bond films
 James Bond (games), the series of video and computer games based on the character and the film series
 James Bond music, the music for the James Bond movies
 James Bond comic strips
 James Bond (comics)
 "James Bond Theme", the main theme for the James Bond movies
 James Bond (Dynamite Entertainment), an spy thriller comic book line

Other fictional characters
 James Bond Jr., the fictional character's nephew.
 Jimmy Bond, a fictional character on The X-Files spin-off TV series, The Lone Gunmen
 James Pond, a secret agent fish on the 1990 video game James Pond: Underwater Agent
 James Bond, a character in Agatha Christie's The Rajah's Emerald

People
 H. James Bond, thoroughbred racehorse trainer and three-time winner of the Saratoga Breeders' Cup Handicap
 James Bond (American football) (1894– 1956), former coach of the Buffalo Bulls college football team
 James Bond (Canadian football) (born 1949), CFL player with the Calgary Stampeders
 James Bond (naval officer) (1945–2016), Royal Australian Navy officer
 James Bond (ornithologist) (1900–1989), author of Birds of the West Indies, whose name was borrowed by Fleming for the character
 James Bond (speedway rider) (born 1938), British motorcycle speedway rider
 James Bond (priest) (1785–1829), Irish Anglican priest
 James Bond III, actor who was also the writer and director of the film Def by Temptation
 Sir James Bond, 1st Baronet (1744–1820), Irish MP
 James Henry Robinson Bond (1871–1943), British soldier
 James Bond Stockdale (1923–2005), US Navy officer, thinker, and political candidate
 Jim Bond (rugby league), New Zealand rugby league international
 Jim Bond (born 1936), American minister
 Jimmy Bond (musician) (1933–2012), American jazz and session musician
 Terance James Bond (born 1946), British painter of birds

Other uses
 9007 James Bond, an asteroid (or minor planet) named after the character
 James Bond (1999 film), a Malayalam language comedy film
 James Bond (2015 film), a Telugu language film
 St. James-Bond Church, Toronto
 James Bond (card game), a matching card game

See also
 Jamie Bond, Australian rules footballer